Cocoon is a French pop-folk band from Clermont-Ferrand (France) that sings in English. It was created in 2006 by Mark Daumail (born 6 December 1984), alongside Morgane Imbeaud. They released the albums My Friends all Died in a Plane Crash in 2007 and Where the Oceans End in 2010, which were defined by dual lead vocals from both, and by its coupling of mostly upbeat-sounding music and very dark lyrics.

Cocoon entered a hiatus in 2011. Daumail then tried to reunite with Imbeaud, but she was busy with other projects and felt that the new songs were Daumail's but not hers, and encouraged him to make the next album alone. The album, Welcome Home, was released in 2016.

History
The band's first album, My Friends all Died in a Plane Crash, was released on 22 October 2007. It proved to be an international commercial and critical success selling over 150,000 copies and certified platinum in France.

After their first album, Cocoon released the live CD/DVD, Back to Panda Mountains, on 7 September 2009. Following the release of a live CD/DVD, they went on a world tour, dubbed the "Baby Panda Tour".

In April 2010, the band started to record their second studio album, Where the Oceans End. This second record also went platinum, selling more than 150,000 copies worldwide.

In 2012, Cocoon entered a hiatus, due to the duo being tired after touring extensively, and wanting to focus on other projects.

During this hiatus, Daumail started to write songs while at the hospital, during his and his family's stay due to his son being born with cardiac problems. He soon realized that those songs were made for Cocoon, and contacted Imbeaud for a reunion. However, she was busy with other projects; she insisted that Daumail would do the new album without her, as its themes were more personal for him. He decided not to replace her by another female singer, and made the album as a sole member.

The album, Welcome Home, featuring Matthew E. White and Natalie Prass, was released in 2016 to similar commercial and critical success.

Mark Daumail
In 2014, Mark Daumail released his solo album entitled Speed of Light that has charted on SNEP Official French Albums Chart and on Ultratop Belgian Wallonia Albums Chart.

Discography

Albums
 My Friends all Died in a Plane Crash (2007)
 Where the Oceans End (2010)
 Welcome Home (2016)
 Wood Fire (2019)

EP
 I Hate Birds (2006)
 From Panda Mountains (2007)
 Covers (2011)
 Pacific Palace (2021)

Singles

 2007 : On My Way - September 2007
 2008 : Chupee – November 2008
 2009 :  Owls (version live) – October 2009
 2010 : Comets – September 2010
 2010 : Oh My God – December 2010
 2011 : American Boy – April 2011
 2011 : Dee Doo – December 2011
 2016 : I Can't Wait – March 2016
 2016 : Get Well Soon – October 2016
 2017 : Miracle – April 2017
 2007 : Spark – May 2019
 2019 : Back to One – May 2019
 2019 : I Got You – September 2019
 2019 : Baby – October 2019
 2021 : Blue Night - January 2021
 2021 : The Road - March 2021

DVD
 Back to Panda Mountains (2009)

Sources
 Anissa Boumachouene, "Cocoon - The Band that is going high", Brain Magazine, 11 June 2007.

References

External links
 Critical review of Where the oceans end (Spanish)

French folk music groups
Folk-pop music groups